Peeter Tali (born 6 August 1964 in Pärnu) is an Estonian military officer and journalist.

In 1990s he was a member of the Congress of Estonia. 1993-1994 he was the chief editor of news agency ETA. 1994-1995 he was the chief editor of newspaper Rahva Hääl.

Since October 2012, he is the head of Ministry of Defence's Strategic Communications Department.

In 2006, he was awarded Order of the Cross of the Eagle, V class.

References

1964 births
Estonia 200 politicians
Estonian editors
Estonian journalists
Estonian military personnel
Living people
Members of the Riigikogu, 2023–2027
People from  Pärnu